Dionysius Wakering (born 1617) was an English lawyer and politician who sat in the House of Commons  from 1654 to 1656.

Wakering was born at Kelvedon, Essex, the son of John Wakering, of Lincoln's Inn and of Kelvedon and his wife Mary Palmer daughter of Dionis Palmer. He was at school at Kelvedon under Mr White and was admitted at Christ's College, Cambridge on 14 May 1633 at the age of 15. He was admitted at Lincoln's Inn on 6 March 1634 and called to the bar in 1641.

In 1654, Wakering was elected Member of Parliament for Essex in the First Protectorate Parliament. He was re-elected MP for Essex in the Second Protectorate Parliament.

References

1617 births
Members of Lincoln's Inn
Alumni of Christ's College, Cambridge
Year of death missing
English MPs 1654–1655
English MPs 1656–1658
People from Kelvedon